The Dwarka Sector 21 metro station is located on the Blue Line of the Delhi Metro. This station was built as an extension together with Dwarka Sector 8 in order to serve Dwarka residents better and provide interchange with the Delhi Airport Express. It was designed by Absolute Architecture. The station was inaugurated on 30 October 2010 after the completion of successful trials and approval from the railway inspector.

Interchange to the Delhi Airport Express are available. Besides serving as a station for the Delhi Metro, the upper levels of the building has been rented out and converted into the a mall, called Pacific D21 Mall. The building consists of the station on the underground levels and the mall and commercials activities on the remaining upper two levels including the ground floor which largely consist of the station premises with the remaining space being covered by mall rent-outs. It will also be the first Delhi Metro station to feature hotel rooms within the complex.

As of August 2014 it had the largest rooftop solar plant in the city. Through this plant, the DMRC plans to produce power for all operations at Dwarka Sector 21 station. The plant has a capacity of 500 kW, and is the largest of its kind in NCR under the Renewable Energy Service model and is a result of cooperation between DMRC and Deutsche Gesellschaft fur Internationale Zusammenarbeit (GIZ) through 'ComSolar', a project that supports commercialization of solar energy in India.

This station has been installed with platform screen doors on the orange line.

Facilities
List of available ATM at Dwarka Sector 21 metro station HDFC Bank, Yes Bank, Canara Bank.

References

Delhi Metro stations
Railway stations opened in 2010
Railway stations in South West Delhi district